Xu Jian may refer to:

 Xu Jian (Tang dynasty) (徐堅; 659–729), Tang dynasty writer and official
 Xu Jian (diplomat) (徐坚; born 1956), former Chinese ambassador to Poland, Romania, and Slovenia
 Xu Jian (engineer) (徐建; born 1958), Chinese civil engineer
 Xu Jian (softball), Chinese softball player